Mamatin or Mamatain or Mamatayn or Mama Tin may refer to:
 Mamatin-e Olya
 Mamatin-e Sofla